Saattup Akia is a mountain of Greenland. It is located in the Upernavik Archipelago. It is the highest point on Innaarsuit Island, at 310 meters (1020 feet).

Mountains of the Upernavik Archipelago